Prolabeo batesi is a species of cyprinid fish endemic to Sierra Leone. It is the only member of its genus.

Prolabeo batesi is known from several rivers in Sierra Leone. It grows to  total length.

References

Cyprinid fish of Africa
Endemic fauna of Sierra Leone
Freshwater fish of West Africa
Taxa named by John Roxborough Norman
Fish described in 1932